Also known as 11.43x60R (61R)

The .577/450 Martini–Henry is a black powder, centrefire rifle cartridge, it was the standard British service cartridge from the early 1870s that went through two changes from the original brass foil wrapped case (with 14 parts) to the drawn brass of two parts, the case and the primer. The .577/450 Martini–Henry was introduced with the Martini–Henry, in service it succeeded the .577 Snider cartridge and was used by all arms of the British armed forces as well British colonial forces throughout the British Empire until it was itself succeeded by the .303 British cartridge after an unsuccessful trial of a .402 calibre

Design
The .577/450 Martini–Henry is a rimmed, bottlenecked centerfire rifle cartridge derived from the .577 Snider, it was lengthened and bottlenecked.  The .577/450 Martini–Henry was developed for use in the single shot Martini–Henry service rifle, originally loaded with blackpowder but later used cordite propellant.

Rifle cartridges

Coiled brass cases
The smooth sided bullet was paper-patched with a thick cake of beeswax below the bullet with two cardboard discs above and a single one below.

As a matter of economy, the Mark I was replaced by the Cartridge S.A. Ball Rifle Breech-Loading Martini Henry Mark II which had a slightly thicker  wall, no strengthening strip and a slightly longer base cap was added.

The Mark IV is visually identical to the Mark III and once removed from its bundle can only be identified by weight, it was produced in batches between 1873 and 1880 by which time complaints about the recoil had ceased, presumably as soldiers became accustomed to it, and later production reverted to the Mark III.

Drawn brass cases & cordite loadings
In service, the coiled brass cases proved to be fragile and prone to sticking in the chamber, so in 1885 a solid drawn brass case was introduced, the Cartridge S.A. Ball Martini Henry Rifle Solid Case Mark I. This was soon replaced by the Cartridge S.A. Ball Martini Henry Rifle Solid Case Mark II with a paper patch that did not extend so far up the bullet. The Mark II cartridge was replaced in British Army service by the .303 British from 1889, but remained in the service of colonial forces for many years.

In 1902 the use of cordite was approved for use in the .577/450 cartridge and the Cartridge S.A. Ball Martini Henry Rifle Solid Case Cordite Mark I was introduced the same year, with a similar cartridge case and bullet, but loaded with cordite.

Carbine cartridges
The lighter carbine loading was less accurate, had a shorter range and less stopping power, but the two were interchangeable.

Coiled brass cases
The Cartridge S.A. Ball Carbine Breech-Loading Martini Henry Mark I was introduced in 1877, it shared the coiled brass case of the Mark III rifle cartridge with a cotton card taking up the unused space left by the use of less powder. In service the Mark I carbine cartridge was found to be inaccurate, so in 1878 the Cartridge S.A. Ball Carbine Breech-Loading Martini Henry Mark II was introduced, which replaced the cotton card with thicker paper lining.  In 1879 the Cartridge S.A. Ball Carbine Breech-Loading Martini Henry Mark III was introduced, the major changes was to the paper patching of the bullet which included longitudinal slits to ensure it was discarded upon the bullet exiting the muzzle.  The Mark III carbine cartridge remained in service for many years.

Drawn brass cases & cordite loadings
The introduction of solid drawn brass cases for rifle cartridges was followed in 1887 with the similar Cartridge S.A. Ball Martini Henry Carbine Solid Case Mark I solid drawn brass carbine cartridge, whilst it retained the same 410 gr bullet it had a heavier  loading of blackpowder. Following the introduction of a cordite rifle cartridge, the Cartridge S.A. Ball Martini Henry Carbine Solid Case Cordite Mark I was introduced in 1903.

Anti-airship cartridges
Prior to World War I, to combat the threat of Zeppelins it was determined that machine guns firing explosive or incendiary rounds were required to ignite the airship's gas. The bullet of the .303 British was too small to carry enough incendiary composition for the intended purpose, so the .577/450 round was adapted to the purpose and in 1914 the Cartridge S.A. Tracer Martini Henry Rifle and Machine Gun Mark I was introduced.

In 1916 a tracer round was developed for the .577/450, the  bullet comprised a cupronickel envelope containing  of tracer element.

Sporting cartridges
The .577/450 was also loaded with a variety of bullets designed for sporting use, including solid, hollow-pointed and copper-tubed bullets.

History
The .577/450 Martini–Henry was introduced into British service in 1871 with the single-shot, dropping block Martini–Henry rifle, replacing the .577 Snider and the Snider–Enfield rifle.

Colonial service
The .577/450 Martini–Henry was first fired in combat on the Malay peninsula in the Perak War of 1875–76, although the first widespread deployment of cartridge and the Martini-Henry rifle occurred in 1878, when it saw service in Southern Africa in the later stages of the Ninth Xhosa war, and later that year in Afghanistan in the Second Anglo-Afghan War. It was used by British forces throughout the Anglo-Zulu War, chambered in both the Martini–Henry and the Swinburn–Henry rifles, the latter a commercially produced rifle designed to avoid contravening the patent for the Martini action.

The .577/450 Martini–Henry, chambered in the Martini–Henry and later the Maxim gun, saw service throughout the British Empire.  In Africa the cartridge saw combat in the Anglo-Zulu War, chambered in both the Martini–Henry and the Swinburn–Henry rifles, the latter a commercially produced rifle designed to avoid contravening the patent for the Martini action, the First Boer War, the Anglo–Sudan War, the Anglo-Egyptian War, the Emin Pasha Relief Expedition, and the First Matabele War, the cartridge continued to see widespread service throughout Africa even after the introduction of the .303 British, seeing service in the Second Boer War in both British and Boer hands.

The .577/450 Martini–Henry also saw service throughout the British Raj, Burma, the various Australian colonies, the Canadian Confederation, the Colony of New Zealand and throughout the Caribbean. The .577/450 Martini–Henry continued in service with various colonial police forces throughout Africa and India up to the First World War.

Great War and subsequent use
The .577/450 Martini–Henry was still in British military service in World War I, in the early stages of the war it was used by the Royal Flying Corps, both by observers and balloon busters.  As late as the 2010s, Martini–Henry rifles have been seized in Taliban caches.

Use

Service weapons chambering the .577/450 Martini–Henry
 Martini–Henry
 Swinburn–Henry
 Maxim gun
 Bira gun
 Civilian Martini-actioned sporting rifles

Sporting use
The .577/.450 lived on as a useful medium bore rifle for sporting or guard use long after it became militarily obsolete. Sporting rifles were made for the cartridge, and surplus military arms were sold off in the Third World (although not in India or the Sudan, where they were banned). The Martini Henry was particularly popular in the Middle East, and demand continued for the cartridges well into the 20th century.

Commercial sporting load. Because of ease of ammunition availability of the military cartridge .577/.450 sporting rifles or Cape guns (a combination double barreled rifle and shotgun) were popular with colonial settlers and army officers.

John Henry Patterson used a Martini .577/.450 to kill the second of the famous Man-Eating Lions of Tsavo.

See also
 List of rifle cartridges
 11×59mmR Gras

References

External links
 Ammo-One, "577/450 Martini-Henry", ammo-one.com , retrieved 2 July 2018.
 Jason Atkin, martinihenry.com, retrieved 2 July 2018.
 Øyvind Flatnes, ".577/.450 Martini-Henry Rifles - Part 1: background history", svartkrutt.net, retrieved 2 July 2018.
 Øyvind Flatnes, ".577/.450 Martini-Henry Rifles - Part 2: shooting and reloading", svartkrutt.net, retrieved 2 July 2018. 
 John McAdams, ".577/450 Martini–Henry: The Right Arm Of The British Empire", thebiggamehuntingblog.com, retrieved 2 July 2018.
 Norfolk Tank Museum, "Martini-Henry .577/450", norfolktankmuseum.co.uk, retrieved 2 July 2018.

Pistol and rifle cartridges
Military cartridges
British firearm cartridges